CJLU-FM (93.9 MHz) is a Canadian radio station, licensed to Dartmouth, Nova Scotia, and serving the Halifax Regional Municipality.  CJLU has a repeater station in Wolfville at 88.3 FM with the call sign CJLU-FM-1.

The stations are owned by the International Harvesters for Christ Evangelistic Association Inc.  They broadcast Contemporary Christian music part of the day with Christian talk and teaching programs heard at other times.  Some religious leaders heard on CJLU-FM include David Jeremiah, Charles Stanley, John MacArthur and Jim Daly.

The station received CRTC approval in 2004 and launched in 2005. CJLU also has a sister station in Moncton, New Brunswick, 105.1 CITA.

On May 21, 2008, CJLU received approval to add a transmitter at Wolfville, Nova Scotia, to simulcast programming on CJLU-FM.

References

External links
www.harvesters.fm

Jlu
Jlu
Radio stations established in 2005
2005 establishments in Nova Scotia